ITV News Tyne Tees is a British television news service produced by ITV Tyne Tees & Border and broadcasting to the "Tyne Tees" region.

Overview

The news service is produced and broadcast from studios at The Watermark, Gateshead with reporters also based at a Teesside office in Billingham. Both regional services (I.e ITV News Tyne Tees and Lookaround) utilise exactly the same presenter(s) and studio/set, therefore one of the two programmes - depending on the day's news - is pre-recorded 'as live' shortly before broadcast.

The "Tyne Tees" news service transmits to County Durham, North Yorkshire, Northumberland and Tyne and Wear.

History

1959–1996
On 15 January 1959, the original Tyne Tees Television news service was launched with short evening bulletins and a weekly magazine programme, North East Roundabout which was broadcast each Friday. On 30 March 1964, it begun airing nightly with the modified name North East Newsview. In 1969, the station's first colour television news programme was broadcast under the new name of Today at Six. From 6 September 1976, Tyne Tees' longest running news programme Northern Life aired with notable presenters including Paul Frost and Pam Royle. On 5 October 1992 this was replaced by Tyne Tees Today (and from 31 March 1993 a sub-regional service would be known as Network North for South of the region only). In November 1995 both Tyne Tees Today and Network North were renamed to Tyne Tees News although separate news services for the North and South of the region unaffected. In January 1996 this was joined by lifestyle programme Tonight.

1996–2005
On Monday 2 September 1996 following the defection of the popular Mike Neville to Tyne Tees from the BBC's Look North after 32 years, North East Tonight was launched, replacing two separate news services and a lifestyle programme.

Mike Neville announced his retirement from the programme on 5 June 2006 after almost a year on sick leave.

2005–2009
In August 2005, following chief presenter Mike Neville's absence the month prior, North East Tonight opted for two separate news services for the Tyne Tees region once again:
North: (Northumberland, Tyne and Wear and Northern County Durham), broadcast from the Pontop Pike and Chatton transmitters.
South: (North Yorkshire, Tees Valley and Southern County Durham), broadcasting from the Bilsdale transmitter.

Other bulletins including GMTV bulletins, weekday lunchtime, weekday late, and weekend early evening were pan-regional.

2009–2013
In September 2007, ITV plc announced that Tyne Tees' newsroom would be merged with ITV Border, subject to Ofcom approval.

On 26 September 2008, Ofcom (the Office of Communications, the UK's broadcasting regulator) authorised ITV's plans to save £40 million a year by making regional programming cutbacks. These include axing mid-morning bulletins on weekdays and lunchtime bulletins at weekends, merging a number of regions and axing most non-news regional programmes.

As part of major ITV regional news cuts, taking place from November 2008 to February 2009, around 50 staff were made redundant or accepted voluntary redundancy at ITV Tyne Tees. On 16 December 2008, Press Gazette leaked that journalists were told that leaving collections were banned, along with leaving presentations and on-screen goodbyes. In a staff memo, head of news Catherine Houlihan cited the ban was because of the large number of staff being made redundant at the station. One worker told Press Gazette that "morale is at rock bottom". The main anchors were announced as Ian Payne and Pam Royle.

The final North and South sub-regional editions of North East Tonight aired on 13 February 2009.

ITV Tyne Tees & Border was formed on 25 February 2009, with Lookaround and North East Tonight titles retained for the 6pm programme and late bulletin each weekday, whilst shorter bulletins were known simply as Tyne Tees & Border News.

The then remaining sub-regional elements were:
The opening 15 minutes of the main 6pm programme.
Full late night bulletins on weeknights, following ITV News at Ten.
Localised weather forecasts.

On 14 January 2013, the "Tyne Tees" news service was relaunched and rebranded as ITV News Tyne Tees.

2013–present
On 14 June 2013, it was reported ITV would restore a full 30-minute edition of Lookaround and shorter bulletins for Border viewers, effectively leading to a demerger of the Tyne Tees and Border services. OFCOM approved the plans a month later, allowing Tyne Tees to reintroduce its own full regional news service. The minutage requirement for the main evening programme was reduced from 30 to 20 minutes, although ITV retain a full half-hour with the option of using some aggregate content from other regions. Daytime and weekend bulletins for the Tyne Tees region were reintroduced on Monday 16 September 2013.

From March 2020, due to the COVID-19 pandemic, ITV Tyne Tees & Border services are impacted. Running times of all short bulletins were reduced. The main 6pm programme was now fronted by a single presenter instead of two.

On 23 November 2020, it was announced the main 6pm programme would return to two presenters from that night, with a slightly modified studio to allow for social distancing.

On 28 March 2021, ITV Tyne Tees announced that Amy Lea would be the new co-presenter of the main weekday news programme alongside Ian Payne as of 29 March 2021, taking over from Pam Royle who left ITV on 26 March 2021.

Notable current on air staff

Helen Carnell
Tori Lacey
Amy Lea
Ian Payne

Former notable on air staff

Emma Baker (ITV News Anglia)
Edward Baran
Kay Burley (Sky News)
Kerrie Gosney (Calendar)
Pete Graves (Sky Sports News)
Catherine Jacob
Bob Johnson
Phil Lavelle (CGNT America)
Debbie Lindley
Lucy Meacock (Granada Reports)
Jon Mitchell
Jonathan Morrell (BBC Radio Newcastle)
Mike Neville (deceased)
Pam Royle
Kate Silverton
Philippa Tomson (Good Morning Britain)

References

External links

1959 British television series debuts
1950s British television series
1960s British television series
1970s British television series
1980s British television series
1990s British television series
2000s British television series
2010s British television series
2020s British television series
ITV regional news shows
Mass media in County Durham
Mass media in Newcastle upon Tyne
Mass media in Tyne and Wear
Television news in England
Television shows produced by Tyne Tees Television
Television shows set in Newcastle upon Tyne